Constanze Feine (born 4 December 1999) is a German female canoeist who was 5th in the C2 sprint senior final at the 2019 Wildwater Canoeing World Championships.

Achievements

References

External links
 

1999 births
Living people
German female canoeists
Place of birth missing (living people)